ILT Stadium Southland in Invercargill, New Zealand is a multi-purpose venue, capable of conducting a wide range of events from large scale concerts to sporting events and exhibitions. Incorporating the SIT Zero Fees Velodrome, the stadium complex has hosted a range of national and international events – sporting, recreational, cultural, arts, corporate and even equestrian.

The original stadium was completed in May 2000 but in September 2010, a heavy snowfall caused the main stadium roof to collapse, causing substantial structural damage to the complex. A replacement stadium opened in February 2014 with  a capacity of 4019, and retractable seating. The stadium also has eleven other community basketball, netball and volleyball courts, four Rebound Ace tennis courts, four squash courts and several corporate lounges.

Home teams
The stadium is home for the Southern Steel netball team in the ANZ Championship, and formerly the championship-winning Southern Sting in the now defunct National Bank Cup netball league. In 2010 the stadium made room for another franchise, the Zero Fees Southland Sharks in the New Zealand National Basketball League.

Velodrome
The SIT Zero Fees Velodrome was the first indoor velodrome in New Zealand.
The $11,000,000 building can hold 1,050 people.

Roof collapse
On 18 September 2010, the roof on the stadium collapsed following a heavy snowfall. The cost of repairs was expected  to run into millions of dollars, with events as far as two years in the future needing to be cancelled.

In December 2010 a Stadium Review Committee found that the roof collapse was due to inadequate workmanship, low building code requirements and unusually heavy snow fall, and on 11 May 2012, the Department of Building and Housing released a report citing construction defects and deficiencies in steel fabrication and welding as contributing factors to the collapse. The report was also referred to the New Zealand Police to investigate.

The stadium reopened in February 2014 under  the new name ILT Stadium Southland.

References

External links 
 Official website of ILT Stadium Southland
 Technical investigation into the collapse of the Stadium Southland roof, Department of Building and Housing Te Tari Kaupapa Whare.

2000 establishments in New Zealand
Sports venues in Invercargill
Netball venues in New Zealand
Basketball venues in New Zealand
Boxing venues in New Zealand
Indoor arenas in New Zealand
2000s architecture in New Zealand
Southern Steel